The Live Love Laugh Foundation is a non-profit organization that deals with mental health issues. It was founded in 2015 by Deepika Padukone as a non-profit NGO to bring awareness to mental health in India. In 2016, the organization launched a program called "You Are Not Alone". Facebook is working with the organization to prevent suicides from being livestreamed.

Focus

The Foundation focuses on the following objectives:

 To create awareness and reduce the stigma around depression
 To fund and support community-based mental health projects that can have a sustainable and a large-scale impact on the society.
 To support research in the area of mental health in India.

The focus of the Live Love Laugh Foundation is to reduce the stigma that surrounds mental health. The foundation spreads awareness and changes the way people look at mental health in general. It provides a platform that enables people who are seeking help to learn more information and connect with mental health professionals. People are able to share and hear others' stories of their own experiences with mental health.

Founder and background 
The Live Laugh Love Foundation was founded by Deepika Padukone, an Indian actress who had depression, along with a board of trustees. She created this foundation to bring more awareness to mental health and to reduce the stigma of it in India. One reason Padukone decided to create this foundation is because, "In India, 90 percent of people who suffer from depression don't seek help." Padukone uses social media as a tool to encourage others to share their personal experiences/stories with mental illness, using the hashtag, #NotAshamed. The year after Padukone founded the Live Love Laugh Foundation, she launched a campaign called "More Than Just Sad" to assist general physicians in properly treating patients with depression or anxiety. Padukone is also the brand ambassador for the NGO Indian Psychiatric Society, which is the largest association of Indian psychiatrists.

There are currently only 3,500 psychiatrists in India, with even fewer psychologists. This makes a ratio of three psychiatrists to every million people. India has the highest rate of depression at 36%, as well as the highest suicide rate of any country in the world.

There are many challenges that people in India face regarding mental health and its stigma. In India, mental illness is seen as a disability and those with a mental illness are discriminated against. It is common for families to be against seeking help for any sort of mental health issue. A sense of denial is another challenge. People may think they are in control of helping themselves which limits them from reaching out to others for help. Receiving therapy is seen as a weakness so it is not common to get help from professionals. Along with this, insurance does not cover issues with mental health, which adds to why people will not seek professional help. Another challenge the people of India face is limited education on mental health. In rural areas, schizophrenia and bipolar disorder is seen as demon possession.

Funding 
This is a non-profit organization. It is currently being funded by sponsors and volunteers who are able to give their time or others who are able to make donations. Anyone who chooses to donate can also specify where they would like their donation to go. The donations can go specifically to the school program, the rural program, or to the foundation in general.

References

External links 
 

Depression (mood)
Mental health organisations in India
Suicide prevention
2015 establishments in Karnataka
Organizations established in 2015